The latin competition in dancesport at the 2009 World Games took place on 25 July 2009 at the Kaohsiung Arena in Kaohsiung, Taiwan.

Competition format
A total of 24 pairs entered the competition. Best eighteen pairs from round one qualifies to the semifinal. From semifinal the best six pairs qualifies to the final.

Results

References

External links
 Results on IWGA website

Dancesport at the 2009 World Games